In enzymology, a xylose isomerase is an enzyme that catalyzes the interconversion of
D-xylose and D-xylulose. This enzyme belongs to the family of isomerases, specifically those intramolecular oxidoreductases interconverting aldoses and ketoses. The isomerase has now been observed in nearly a hundred species of bacteria. Xylose-isomerases are also commonly called fructose-isomerases due to their ability to interconvert glucose and fructose. The systematic name of this enzyme class is D-xylose aldose-ketose-isomerase. Other names in common use include D-xylose isomerase, D-xylose ketoisomerase, and D-xylose ketol-isomerase.

History
The activity of D-xylose isomerase was first observed by Mitsuhashi and Lampen in 1953 in the bacterium Lactobacillus pentosus. Artificial production through transformed E.coli have also been successful.   In 1957, the D-xylose isomerase activity on D-glucose conversion to D-fructose was noted by Kooi and Marshall. It is now known that isomerases have broad substrate specificity. Most pentoses and some hexoses are all substrates for D-xylose isomerase. Some examples include: D-ribose, L-arabinose, L-rhamnose, and D-allose.

Conversion of glucose to fructose by xylose isomerase was first patented in the 1960s, however, the process was not industrially viable as the enzymes were suspended in solution, and recycling the enzyme was problematic. An immobile xylose isomerase that was fixed on a solid surface was first developed in Japan by Takanashi. These developments were essential to the development of industrial fermentation processes used in manufacturing high-fructose corn syrup.

The tertiary structure was determined for several xylose isomerases from microbes starting in the mid 1980s (Streptomyces olivochromogenes in 1988, Streptomyces violaceoniger in 1988, Streptomyces rubiginosus in 1984, Arthrobacter B3728 in 1986, Actinoplanes missouriensis in 1992, and Clostridium thermosulfurogenes in  1990).

Function 
This enzyme participates in pentose and glucuronate interconversions and fructose and mannose metabolism. The most bio-available sugars according to the International Society of Rare Sugars are: glucose, galactose, mannose, fructose, xylose, ribose, and L-arabinose. Twenty hexoses and nine pentoses, including xylulose, were considered to be "rare sugars". Hence D-xylose isomerase is used to produce these rare sugars which have very important applications in biology despite their low abundance.

Characterization
Xylose isomerase that can be isolated from red Chinese rice wine, which contains the bacterium Lactobacillus xylosus. This bacterium was mistakenly classified as a L. plantarum, which normally grows on the sugar L-arabinose, and rarely grown on D-xylose. L. xylosus was recognized to be distinct for its ability to grow on D-xylose.
Xylose isomerase in L. xylosus has a molecular weight of about 183000 Daltons.
Its optimum growth pH is about 7.5 for the L. lactis, however strains such as the L.brevis xylose enzyme prefer a more alkaline environment. The L. lactis strain is stable over the pH range of 6.5 to 11.0, and the L. brevis enzyme, which is less tolerant of pH changes, show activity over the pH range of 5.7–7.0. Thermal tests were also done by Kei Y. and Noritaka T. and the xylose isomerase was found to be thermally stable to about 60 degrees Celsius

Active site and mechanism
Xylose isomerase has a structure that is based on eight alpha/beta barrels that create an active site holding two divalent magnesium ions. Xylose isomerase enzymes exhibit a TIM barrel fold with the active site in the centre of the barrel and a tetrameric quaternary structure. PDB structures are available in the links in the infobox to the right. The protein is a tetramer where paired barrels are nearly coaxial, which form two cavities in which the divalent metals are both bound to one of the two cavities. The metals are in an octahedral geometry. Metal site 1 binds the substrate tightly, while metal site two binds the substrate loosely. Both share an acid residue Glutamic acid 216 of the enzyme that bridges the two cations. Two basic amino acids surround the negative charged ligands to neutralize them. The second cavity faces the metal cavity and both cavities share the same access route. The second cavity is hydrophobic in nature, and has an important histidine residue that is activated by an aspartate residue that is hydrogen bonded to it. This histidine residue is important in the isomerization of glucose.

In the isomerization of glucose, Histidine 53 is used to catalyze the proton transfer of O1 to O5; the diagram for the ring opening mechanism is shown below. The first metal, mentioned earlier, coordinates to O3 and O4, and is used to dock the substrate.

In the isomerization of xylose, crystal data has shown that xylose sugar binds to the enzyme in an open chain conformation. Metal 1 binds to O2 and O4, and once bound, metal 2 binds to O1 and O2 in the transition state, and these interactions along with a lysine residue help catalyze the hydride shift necessary for isomerization. The transition state consists of a high energy carbonium ion that is stabilized through all the metal interactions with the sugar substrate.

Application in industry 
The most widely used application of this enzyme is in the conversion of glucose to fructose to produce high fructose corn syrup (HFCS). There are three general steps in producing HFCS from starch:
 enzymatic degradation of the starch using α-amylase. Also known as liquification.
 further degradation using glucoamylase and a debranching enzyme.
 Production of fructose through xylose isomerase

The process is carried out in bioreactors at 60–65 °C.  Enzymes become inactivated at high temperatures like this, and one focus of research has been engineering more thermostable versions of xylose isomerase and the other enzymes in the process.  The enzymes are generally immobilized to increase throughput; better ways to do this has been another research focus.

Xylose isomerase is one of the enzymes used by bacteria in nature to use cellulose as food and another focus on industrial and academic research, has been developing versions of xylose isomerase that could be useful in the production of biofuel.

As a dietary supplement 
Products containing Xylose-Isomerase are sold as over-the-counter dietary supplements to combat fructose malabsorption, primarily in Europe and under brand names including Fructaid, Fructease and Fructosin. Apart from general concerns over the effectiveness of OTC-enzymes, there is currently very limited research available on Xylose-Isomerase as a dietary supplement, with the sole scientific study indicating a positive effect on malabsorption-related nausea and abdominal pain, but none on bloating.

References

Further reading 

 
 
 

EC 5.3.1
Enzymes of known structure